The 2019–20 Women's EHF Challenge Cup is the 23rd edition of the European Handball Federation's third-tier competition for women's handball clubs, running from 9 November 2019.
On 24 April 2020 EHF announced that the competition would be cancelled due to COVID-19 pandemic.

Overview

Team allocation
There will be no matches in Round 1 and 2 and 22 teams will start in Round 3 with the first leg scheduled for 10–11 November and second leg for 17–18 November 2019, while 5 teams were directly seeded for the Last 16 round. The European Handball Federation rearranged the Last 16 phase of the Women's Challenge Cup 2019–20 after the Turkish club Ardeşen GSK withdrew from the competition. In order to harmonize the competition after the withdrawal of Ardeşen GSK, the EHF decided to award Aula Alimentos de Valladolid, as the best seeded team in the Women's Challenge Cup 2019–20 a place directly in the Quarterfinals.

Round and draw dates
All draws were held at the European Handball Federation headquarters in Vienna, Austria.
On 25 March, the EHF announced that no matches will be played before June due to the coronavirus pandemic.

Qualification stage

Round 3
There were 22 teams participating in round 3.
The draw seeding pots are composed as follows:

Teams listed first played the first leg at home. The first legs were played on 8–10 November and the second legs were played on 16–17 November 2019. Some teams agreed to play both matches in the same venue.

|}
Notes

1 Both legs were hosted by SIR 1º de Maio/ADA CJ Barros.
2 Both legs were hosted by CS Madeira.
3 Both legs were hosted by HIB Handball Graz.
4 Both legs were hosted by ŽRK Bjelovar.
5 Both legs were hosted by ŽRK Krivaja.
6 Both legs were hosted by ŽRK Zaječar 1949.

Last 16
The European Handball Federation has decided 5 teams to proceed directly seeded for the Last 16 round. The European Handball Federation rearranged the Last 16 phase of the Women's Challenge Cup 2019–20 after the Turkish club Ardeşen GSK withdrew from the competition. In order to harmonize the competition after the withdrawal of Ardeşen GSK, the EHF decided to award Aula Alimentos de Valladolid, as the best seeded team in the Women's Challenge Cup 2019–20 a place directly in the Quarterfinals.
The draw seeding pots were composed as follows:

The draw for the Last 16 took place at the EHF Office in Vienna on Thursday 19 November 2019.

Teams listed first played the first leg at home. The first legs was played on 1–2 February and the second legs were played on 8–9 February 2020. Some teams agreed to play both matches in the same venue.

Overview

|}

Notes

1 Both legs were hosted by RK Lokomotiva Zagreb.
2 Both legs were hosted by CS Madeira.
3 Both legs were hosted by Mecalia Atlético Guardés.
4 Both legs were hosted by Maccabi Rishon LeZion.

Matches

RK Lokomotiva Zagreb won 60–37 on aggregate.

CS Madeira won 61–33 on aggregate.

Mecalia Atlético Guardés won 64–57 on aggregate.

KH-7 BM Granollers won 72–42 on aggregate.

HC Naisa Niš won 60–38 on aggregate.

JuRo Unirek VZV won 55–44 on aggregate.

ŽRK Bjelovar won 56–46 on aggregate.

Quarterfinals
For the quarter-finals, there was no seeding as all eight teams will be drawn from the same pot one after another. There was also be no country protection applied in the draw. The semi-final draw followed using the quarter-final pairings.

Qualified teams
 Aula Alimentos de Valladolid
 ŽRK Bjelovar
 RK Lokomotiva Zagreb
 CS Madeira
 Mecalia Atlético Guardés
 HC Naisa Niš
 JuRo Unirek VZV
 KH-7 BM Granollers

The draw event was held at the EHF Office in Vienna on Tuesday 11 February 2020. The draw determined the quarter-final and also the semi-final pairings. Teams listed first will play the first leg at home.

The first legs were played on 29 February–1 March and the second legs were played on 7–8 March 2020.

|}
Notes

1 Both legs were hosted by CS Madeira.

Matches 

Aula Alimentos de Valladolid won 49–45 on aggregate.

HC Naisa Niš won 60–40 on aggregate.

KH-7 BM Granollers won 61–56 on aggregate.

RK Lokomotiva Zagreb won 58–44 on aggregate.

Final four
The first legs were scheduled to 4–5 April and the second legs were scheduled to 11–12 April 2020, but the European Handball Federation announced on 13 March 2020, that the Semi-final matches will not be held as scheduled due to the ongoing developments in the spread of COVID-19 across Europe.
On 25 March, the EHF announced that no matches will be played before June due to the coronavirus pandemic and Women's Challenge Cup is foreseen to be played in an EHF FINAL4 format in one venue over two playing days. On 24 April 2020 the matches were cancelled.

Bracket

Semifinals

Third place game

Final

Top goalscorers

See also
2019–20 Women's EHF Champions League
2019–20 Women's EHF Cup

References

External links 
 EHF Womens Challenge Cup (official website)

Women's EHF Challenge Cup
EHF Challenge Cup
EHF Challenge Cup
EHF Challenge Cup (women)